Egglestone may refer to;

Geographical locations
Egglestone Abbey, abandoned Premonstratensian Abbey on the southern (Yorkshire) bank of the River Tees in England

People with the surname Egglestone
John Egglestone (1847–1912), Australian cricketer
Pat Egglestone (born 1927), English former professional footballer
Sarah Egglestone, member of the pop band A Touch of Class 
William Ecclestone or Egglestone (fl. 1610–1623), actor in English Renaissance theatre
Rachel Egglestone-Evans (born 1980), British journalist and editor of Vintage Life Magazine

See also
Eggleston (disambiguation)